Coca is a municipality in the province of Segovia, central Spain, part of the autonomous community of Castile and Leon. It is located 50 kilometres northwest of the provincial capital city of Segovia, and 60 kilometres from Valladolid. Castillo de Coca, a 15th-century Mudéjar-style castle is located in the town. It was also the birthplace of Roman Emperor Theodosius I in 347 CE. The town had a population of 2,131 in 2009.

Economy
The town is surrounded by pine forests which contribute to the economy of the town and the region. Tourism is important too, with historic sites as major attractions.

Art 
 Coca Castle 
 San Nicolás, Mudéjar tower
 Coca Walls and La Villa main door
 Vaccaei walls
 Santa María la Mayor church
 City hall
 Nuestra Señora de La Merced hospital
 Verracos vettones of Coca
 Roman domus
 Roman cloaca
 Puente Grande bidge
 Puente Chico bridge

References

Municipalities in the Province of Segovia
Archaeological sites in Spain